Octospora is a genus of fungi in the family Pyronemataceae.

Species
Octospora axillaris
Octospora carbonigena
Octospora coccinea
Octospora convexula
Octospora crosslandii
Octospora humosa 
Octospora leucoloma
Octospora melina
Octospora musci-muralis
Octospora neglecta
Octospora roxheimii
Octospora rubens
Octospora rustica

Common names
An annual competition is run in the UK to give common names to species that currently only have Latin nomenclature, in order to make them more familiar to non-specialists. The fungus Octospora humosa, which is orange and grows among moss was given the name Hotlips, reflecting its bright colour and shape.

References

Pyronemataceae
Pezizales genera